Eric Zann is an alias of electronic musician Jim Jupp (along with Belbury Poly). Jupp's releases are on the Ghost Box Music label, of which he is a co-founder. The name references a minor H. P. Lovecraft short story, The Music of Erich Zann.

Eric Zann's sound 
Zann's sound is deliberately darker and more Gothic than other Ghost Box artists, containing elements of Hammer Horror soundtracks, ambient music and drones; in Jupp's words, "it's full of crows, church bells, magick spells and other gothic clichés".

Discography 
 4 April 2005 Ouroborindra, CD

References

External links 
 Stylus Magazine review of Ouroborindra
 Ghost Box Music page

Welsh electronic musicians
Ghost Box Music artists
Year of birth missing (living people)
Living people